Jim Keddie (31 May 1906 – 13 October 1984) was  a former Australian rules footballer who played with St Kilda in the Victorian Football League (VFL).

Notes

External links 
		

1906 births
1984 deaths
Australian rules footballers from Victoria (Australia)
St Kilda Football Club players
Brunswick Football Club players